James Traill may refer to:
 James Traill (bishop), Anglican bishop
 James Hamilton Traill, Australian flying ace
 James Traill (cricketer), English cricketer and barrister

See also
 James Trail, British lawyer and politician
 James W. H. Trail, Scottish botanist